Times Have Been Better is a French comedy television film, directed by Régis Musset and released in 2006. The film stars Arnaud Binard as Jérémy, a 30-year-old man who comes out as gay to his parents, only to have his parents Guy (Bernard Le Coq) and Rosine (Charlotte de Turckheim) react more negatively than expected.

The film's cast also includes Olivier Guéritée, Stéphane Boucher, Thierry Desroses, Pierre Deny and Chantal Ravalec.

The film was screened at selected LGBT film festivals beginning in 2006, before having its television premiere on France 2 in April 2007. It was rebroadcast by the network in 2010.

The film won the award for Best Foreign Narrative Feature at the 2007 New York Lesbian and Gay Film Festival.

References

External links

2006 films
2006 comedy films
2006 LGBT-related films
French comedy films
French LGBT-related films
LGBT-related comedy films
LGBT-related television films
2000s French films
Comedy television films